Nuakfuppa Creek is a stream in the U.S. state of Mississippi.

Nuakfuppa is a name derived from the Choctaw language, and depending on source is purported to mean "oak tree" or "mudcat fish". Variant name is "Nucefuppa Creek".

References

Rivers of Mississippi
Rivers of Jasper County, Mississippi
Mississippi placenames of Native American origin